The Guatemala International is an open badminton tournament held in Guatemala. The tournament has been an International Series level in 1997, 1998, 1999, 2003, 2012, 2013, 2016, then in 2009 categorized as Future Series level, and in 2010, 2011, 2014, 2015 categorized as International Challenge by the Badminton World Federation. The tournament is sanctioned by the Badminton World Federation, so the players can improved their point in world ranking.

In 2013, the tournament was an International Series level, with the official participation of athletes from 8 countries. In 2014, the Huawei sponsored tournament gathered 120 athletes from 15 countries. In 2015 and 2016, the tournament was held at the  Olympic City Sports Coliseum, and sponsored by Herbalife. The 2015 season was a part of the 2016 Rio Olympics qualification, and have a total pursue $15,000, which attracted 97 players from 33 countries, and for the 2016, 63 players from 12 countries competes. In 2017, the national federation host two level 4 badminton tournament, the Future and International Series.

Previous winners

Guatemala International

Guatemala Future Series

Performances by nation

Guatemala International

Guatemala Future Series

References

External links
 Federación Nacional de Bádminton Guatemala

Badminton tournaments
Sports competitions in Guatemala
Badminton tournaments in Guatemala